Traheron is a surname. Notable people with the surname include:

Bartholomew Traheron (1510?–1558?), English Protestant writer
Philip Traheron (1635–1686), British diplomat and author